The International Council on Combustion Engines e.V., which acronym: CIMAC, originates from its French name: Conseil International des Machines à Combustion, is a registered association that represents the worldwide interests of the large engine industry as an umbrella association in dealings with regulatory authorities and standardization bodies. CIMAC was founded in Paris in 1951 and moved its secretariat from London to Frankfurt in 1996. CIMAC is made up of approximately 500 national associations and large companies from 27 countries in America, Asia and Europe. In addition to manufacturers of large engines and their suppliers, its members also include users of large engines (including shipowners, power plant operators, railway operators), fuel and lubricant manufacturers, universities and development service providers.

Organizational structure 
The CIMAC Board prepares decisions which must be approved by the CIMAC Council. The CIMAC Council is composed of delegates from the 15 National Members Associations (NMAs) and 18 direct corporate members. This body also elects the President of CIMAC, who has been elected every 3 years since 1993. Below the management there are 11 permanent working groups which deal with questions and developments in the various areas of the large engine industry and develop position papers, guidelines and technical recommendations. In addition, there is a strategy group greenhouse gas. In 2016, for example, the Fuel Working Group issued a guideline for the uniform analysis of fuels with regard to their sulphur content. The technical papers produced by the CIMAC working groups are used by organisations such as the International Association of Classification Societies (IACS), the UN International Maritime Organization (IMO) and others in matters of standardisation. The results of the working groups are regularly presented at international seminars, workshops and the CIMAC Congress.

Congress 
The central platform for exchange within the large engines industry is the CIMAC Congress. It takes place every 3 years on different continents and at different locations. The latest developments in drive technologies are presented and discussed at the congress. The last CIMAC Congress was held in Vancouver in 2019 and three years earlier in Helsinki. The next CIMAC Congress was scheduled for 2022 in Busan, Korea, but had to be postponed to 2023 due to the COVID-19 pandemic.

History 
CIMAC was founded in 1951. The acronym CIMAC is derived from the French Congrès International des Moteurs A Combustion Interne in adaptation to the place of foundation Paris. In the years following the end of the World War II, reconstruction and growth were high on the agenda of many countries. The demand for energy was correspondingly high. The internal combustion engine was regarded as a central component in providing the necessary energy. Technical developments were needed, but nobody knew exactly who in the world was working on what. CIMAC was therefore founded as a forum for greater transparency and mutual exchange in the industry. Since then, CIMAC has grown from a group of large engine manufacturers and their suppliers to a platform where customer industries are also represented. While efficiency issues dominated in the early days, the reduction of emissions has been in the foreground for some years now.

Presidents 
Since 1951 CIMAC has had 18 presidents:

Further reading 
 Cimac Congress looks to the Future, Marine Propulsion & Auxiliary Machinery, August/September 2016
 CIMAC´s Executive Decision Roberta Prandi, Diesel & Gas Turbine Worldwide, December 2013
 System Efficiency is the next big Challenge, Karl Woijk, Marine Propulsion, February/March 2014

References

External links 
 

Organizations established in 1951
Trade associations based in Germany
Organisations based in Frankfurt
1951 establishments in France